The Irish Tarmac Rally Championship (ITRC) is the premier rallying series in Ireland. It is held annually and is promoted by the Tarmac Rally Organisers’ Association (TROA). The Championship takes place over seven events, based in the Republic of Ireland and in Northern Ireland, using special stages, which are run against the clock, on closed public tarmac roads.

The overall Championship title is contested by drivers and co-drivers using cars homologated in FIA classes RC2 (R5/ Rally2), RC3, RC4, RC5 and RG-T. Right Hand Drive Group R5 derivative cars, conforming to Group R5 specification as per Group R5 homologation papers (except for a right-hand drive conversion) can also be used.

Since 2016, WRC cars have not been eligible to score Championship points. However, competitors using WRC cars are able to win events outright. 

Three other championships, the ITRC Junior Championship, the ITRC Historic Championship and the ITRC Modified Tarmac Championship, run in parallel with the ITRC, but with different regulations.

History 
The ITRC was created following the establishment of TROA in late 1977, when the organisers of the five Irish International rallies and the Manx International Rally came together with the idea of forming a championship. The inaugural Championship began in 1978 and consisted of six events: the Galway International Rally; Circuit of Ireland Rally; Donegal International Rally; Ulster Rally; Cork 20 International Rally; and the Manx International Rally. 

The first major change to the series came in 1983, when the Rally of the Lakes attained International status and was installed as the final event in that year's championship. The addition of the Killarney-based round made up for the loss of the Galway International Rally, which did not run. The following year, the Galway International Rally returned and the Rally of the Lakes was retained, expanding the Championship to seven rounds from 1984 on.

The next significant change took place in 2002, when the Jim Clark Rally was added to the series, taking the Championship to eight rounds overall. The Jim Clark Rally was the first Scottish event to form part of the Championship, until it was dropped in 2010, along with the Manx International Rally, mainly due to a decline in the number of ITRC competitors entering both events.

The Championship reverted to seven rounds in 2015, when the West Cork Rally joined the ITRC as a full round, having previously been part the Modified Tarmac Championship calendar in 2014.

Current Format and Event Calendar 
The Irish Tarmac Championship consists of seven rounds:

 Galway International Rally
 West Cork Rally
 Easter Stages Rally
 Killarney Rally of the Lakes
 Donegal International Rally
 Ulster Rally 
 Cork 20 International Rally

Previous Events 
The following events have also been included in the Irish Tarmac Rally Championship in the past:

 Circuit of Ireland Rally
 Jim Clark Rally
 Manx International Rally
 Summit 2000 Rally - a one off event, organised by Enniskillen Motor Club, that took place in May 2000, following the cancelation of three key rounds from that year's calendar. The Ulster Rally was undergoing organisational restructuring and was not part of the Championship; the Galway International Rally had suffered from adverse public relations after a series of incidents relating to anti-social behaviour and decided to sit the year out; while the Circuit of Ireland organisers faced a lack of entries and a date clash with the Rally of the Lakes and as a result cancelled the event.

Points System 
Competitors best scores in 5 out of 7 rounds are used to calculate the final Championship standings. Every driver and co-driver finishing each round in the top 10 are awarded championship points, with the winner receiving 17 points. Each finisher outside of the top 10 receives 1.5 points.  

A bonus system normally operates during the final round, with additional points on offer to the winners of each leg of the event, as well as for final positions.

2022 season 
In July 2021, TROA released a statement regarding their intention to run a full championship in 2022.

Killarney & District Motor Club announced that the Killarney Historic Rally will take place on 27 November 2021. This rally will count as the opening round of the ITRC Historic Championship.

With COVID-19 restrictions effectively coming to an end, a full 2022 calendar was announced by Motorsport Ireland and TROA.

2021 season 
In February 2021, the TROA decided to cancel the 2021 Championship.  Northern Ireland and the Republic of Ireland were still subject to restrictions designed to curb the impact of the Covid-19 pandemic and the TROA announcement cited the uncertainty surrounding the running of championship events during 2021. At the point the decision was taken to cancel the Championship, the opening three rounds of the Championship had already been called off.

2020 season 
The 2020 season commenced with the opening round in Galway in February 2020. The West Cork Rally was cancelled on 12 March 2020, due to the global COVID-19 outbreak. On 20 March, Motorsport Ireland issued a statement that all motorsport events were suspended until 1 June 2020, which led to the postponement of the following rounds. Amidst on-going restrictions aimed at curbing the effects of the pandemic, the board of directors and executive of TROA made the unanimous decision to cancel the 2020 Championship on 28 April 2020.

2019 season 
Galway International Rally returned to the calendar in 2019, following the cancellation of the 2018 event. The Easter Stages Rally replaced the Circuit of Ireland Rally event for the third year in a row.

The overall champion was Craig Breen, co-driven by Paul Nagle, after winning five rounds.

Top 10 ITRC drivers overall:

Broadcasting
Coverage of events has been provided by On the Limit Sports since 2003. The ITRC is available to view on a variety of platforms, including television (TG4, BT Sport) and on demand via internet streaming services.

References

External links
 Official website

Rally racing series
Rally competitions in Ireland